Johannes-Leopold Antik (13 January 1885 Ulila Parish (now Elva Parish), Kreis Dorpat – 1959 Omsk Oblast, Russia) was an Estonian politician. He was a member of IV Riigikogu. He was a member of the Riigikogu since 15 October 1929. He replaced Jüri Ottas. On 30 September 1930, he resigned his position and he was replaced by Jüri Uluots.

References

1885 births
1959 deaths
People from Elva Parish
People from Kreis Dorpat
Farmers' Assemblies politicians
Members of the Riigikogu, 1929–1932
Members of the Estonian National Assembly
Members of the Riiginõukogu